"Remember Me" is a 1997 song by British DJ Alexis 'Lex' Blackmore under his pseudonym Blue Boy, released as a single only. Built around samples performed by American singer Marlena Shaw, the song peaked at  8 on the UK Singles Chart in February 1997 and No. 2 on the US Billboard Hot Dance Club Play chart. It was a top-10 hit in Denmark, Finland, Iceland, Ireland, Norway, Spain, Sweden and Switzerland. On the Eurochart Hot 100, the track reached No. 13.

Background
The track originally appeared on Mark Farina's remix album Mushroom Jazz Volume One. Jive Records acquired it and earmarked it for single release. The radio edit was remixed by Sure Is Pure, who were also responsible for a couple of top 20 remixes of Sister Sledge songs in 1993, released on the duo's Pharm sublabel imprint.

"Remember Me" is built around samples from "Woman of the Ghetto" by American jazz, blues and soul singer Marlena Shaw: "Remember me? I'm the one who had your babies", in reference to African-American maids raising white children for little pay, came from a live version, whereas the "ging, gi-gi-gi-gi-ging..." sample repeated throughout the song is the scat portion of the original song's refrain. Shaw had the following to say about it:

Critical reception
Larry Flick from Billboard described the song as a "wickedly catchy dance anthem", noting further that "while the groove is appropriately aggressive and street-credible, the song is iced with accessible keyboards, and a loopy hook takes up permanent residence in the brain upon impact." Australian music channel Max included "Remember Me" in their list of "1000 Greatest Songs of All Time" in 2012. In 1996, Andy Beevers from Music Weeks RM Dance Update wrote that it is "wooing the jazz and funk crowd", placing a Marlena Shaw classic "over a very basic but very bouncy funk rhythm. It's blindingly simple, dead cheeky and undeniably effective". Later, in 1997, another editor James Hyman rated it five out of five, calling it a "ridiculously simple and thus ultra-catchy funker". He added that the samples "and the subsequent 'Remember me, I'm the one who had your babies' hook added to a sparse hip hop break and a gently throbbing bassline not only recalls another classic—the Young Disciples' 'Apparently Nothin'—but commands an instant top 10 chart placing."

Chart performance
"Remember Me" was very successful on the charts all over the world. In Europe, it was a top 10 hit in Denmark, Finland, Iceland, Ireland, Norway, Spain, Sweden, Switzerland and the UK. In the latter, the single peaked at number eight in its third week on the UK Singles Chart, on 9 February 1997. It also reached the top spot on both the UK Dance and UK R&B singles charts. Additionally, "Remember Me" was a top 20 hit in Belgium, France, Germany, Italy and the Netherlands, as well as on the Eurochart Hot 100, where it peaked at No. 13 in June 1997. Outside Europe, it reached number two on the Billboard Hot Dance Club Play chart in the US, number six on the RPM Dance/Urban chart in Canada and No. 17 in Australia. The single was awarded with a gold record in Australia and the UK, with a sale of 35,000 and 400,000 units.

Track listings

UK CD single
"Remember Me" (Sure Is Pure 7-inch edit)
"Remember Me" (original 12-inch)
"Remember Me" (Sure Is Pure 12-inch remix)
"Remember Me" (Cavern 3 remix)
"Remember Me" (Rae and Christian remix)

UK 12-inch single
A1. "Remember Me" (Sure Is Pure 7-inch edit)
A2. "Remember Me" (Sure Is Pure 12-inch remix)
B1. "Remember Me" (original 12-inch)
B2. "Remember Me" (Rae and Christian remix)

UK cassette single
"Remember Me" (Sure Is Pure 7-inch edit)
"Remember Me" (original 12-inch)

European maxi-CD single
"Remember Me" (Sure Is Pure 7-inch edit)
"Remember Me" (original 7-inch edit)
"Remember Me" (Deep Zone club mix)
"Remember Me" (Dub Zone)
"Remember Me" (Sure Is Pure 12-inch remix)
"Remember Me" (original 12-inch)
"Remember Me" (Sub dub)

European 12-inch single
A1. "Remember Me" (Deep Zone club mix)
A2. "Remember Me" (Dub Zone)
B1. "Remember Me" (Sure Is Pure 12-inch remix)
B2. "Remember Me" (original 12-inch)

US CD single
"Remember Me" (radio edit)
"Remember Me" (12-inch remix)
"Remember Me" (original mix)

US maxi-CD single
"Remember Me" (Sure Is Pure radio edit) – 3:49
"Remember Me" (Deep Zone club mix) – 7:27
"Remember Me" (Mad House vocal mix) – 3:51
"Remember Me" (original 12-inch) – 7:02
"Remember Me" (Da Ill Flip remix) – 6:47
Mushroom Jazz sampler – 5:05

US 12-inch single
A1. "Remember Me" (Deep Zone club mix)
A2. "Remember Me" (Sub dub)
B1. "Remember Me" (Sure Is Pure 7-inch)
B2. "Remember Me" (Pimplab mix)
B3. "Remember Me" (Da Ill Flip mix)

Australian and New Zealand CD single
"Remember Me" (original edit) – 3:59
"Remember Me" (original 12-inch) – 7:04
"Remember Me" (Mad House vocal mix) – 5:11
"Remember Me" (Sure Is Pure mix 1) – 10:46
"Remember Me" (Sure Is Pure mix 2) – 10:26
"Remember Me" (Marc Rae mix) – 6:56

Charts

Weekly charts

Year-end charts

Certifications

Cover versions and sampling
In late 2008, the Australian psychedelic rock band Tame Impala started performing this song as part of their live sets, eventually recording a cover version of it as a B-side to the "Sundown Syndrome" single. This cover became quite popular in Australia, reaching No. 78 on the Triple J Hottest 100, 2009.

In November 2012, British musician Daley sampled this song for his own composition "Remember Me", with the refrain sung by Jessie J.

In 2013, South African group Goldfish sampled the song for their track "Three Second Memory". TheSouthAfrican.com said of the song: "Where to start? Obviously the title track, which takes the vocal sample "Remember Me" and builds around it to a level which justifies its standing as the basis of the album."

References

1997 songs
1997 singles
British dance songs
British funk songs
Jive Records singles
Om Records singles